Porcellio monticola is a species of woodlouse in the genus Porcellio belonging to the family Porcellionidae that can be found in such European countries as Austria, France, Germany, Hungary, Luxembourg, Spain, and Switzerland.

References

Crustaceans described in 1853
Porcellionidae
Woodlice of Europe